Take a Chance was a Canadian quiz show by Roy Ward Dickson adapted from radio. It was one of the first series on CTV when the network began in 1961. The program was produced in the Toronto suburb of Scarborough at CFTO-TV studios and was broadcast Mondays at 9:30 PM (EST). Sheila Billing, the Miss Toronto pageant winner of 1955, was a co-host of the program.

On its premiere, Toronto Star television critic Jeremy Brown deemed the show to be "painful to watch" and "dreary", complaining that the programme lacked structure, suspense and substantial prize monies.

At one point, 438,000 viewers participated in the contests by submitting chewing gum wrappers as Chiclets was the programme's key sponsor.

Take a Chance aired until 1965.

References

External links
 TVArchive.ca article

1961 Canadian television series debuts
1965 Canadian television series endings
1960s Canadian game shows
CTV Television Network original programming
Quiz shows
Television shows filmed in Toronto